Herod (originally King Herod; April 1758 – 12 May 1780) was a Thoroughbred racehorse. He was one of the three foundation sires of the modern Thoroughbred racehorse, along with Matchem and Eclipse. Herod was the foundation sire responsible for keeping the Byerley Turk sire-line alive.

Background
Bred by Prince William, Duke of Cumberland, he was by the stallion Tartar, a very good racehorse, who won many races including the King's plate at Litchfield, the King's plate at Guildford, and the King's plate at Newmarket. In addition to Herod, Tartar sired Thais (dam of Silvertail), Fanny (second dam of King Fergus), the O'Kelly Old Tartar mare (dam of Volunteer), and others. Herod's dam, Cypron (1750 bay filly), was bred by Sir W. St Quintin. Herod was a half-brother Lady Bolingbroke (dam of Tetotum, Epsom Oaks) and a mare (1757) (dam of Clay Hall Marske) by Regulus.

Description
Herod was a fine, bay horse standing 15.3 hands high with a small star and no white on his legs. He was a powerful horse that was especially good at four-mile distances.

Racing career
Herod began racing at five, the usual age to begin training for this period, in October 1763 winning a race on the four mile Beacon course at Newmarket. At age six, he won another race at Newmarket, followed by a four-miler at Ascot and a match against Antinous over the Beacon course. When he was seven, his owner died and he was sold in a dispersal sale to Sir John Moore, and it wasn't until 1766 that he returned to the track, where he won again against Antinous in a match over the same course.

His career began to close at this point, as he lost to Ascham, then to Turf, and then finished last in a race at York, after a bleeding attack. He started twice the following year, before retiring to stud.

Breeding career
Herod retired in 1770 and stood at the stud of Sir John Moore at Neather Hall, for a fee of 10 guineas, later raised to 25 guineas. He was the leading sire in Great Britain eight times, (1777 to 1784), before his son, Highflyer (1785 to 1796, 1798) and grandson Sir Peter Teazle (1799 to 1802, and 1804 to 1809) took over. Herod's male line continues today in the pedigree of the 2007 Eclipse Stakes winner, Notnowcato. His most important offspring include:

 Florizel: 1768 bay colt, won 16 races out of 23 starts. Sired Diomed, winner of the first Derby and incredibly influential sire in America.
 Fortitude: sire of John Bull
 Highflyer: 1774 bay colt, the most important son of Herod. Unbeaten in 14 races, leading sire several times, one of the 4 foundation lines of the classic Thoroughbred. Got Sir Peter Teazle, Rockingham, Delpini, Escape, St. George, and broodmare Prunella.
 Justice: sired Rhadamanthus, Daedalus, and Trifle
 Phoenomenon: won the St. Leger, leading sire
 Woodpecker: 1773 chestnut colt, won the Craven Stakes in 1778, 1779 and 1781, and a 1,400 guineas handicap sweep in 1780 and 140 guineas purse at Newmarket in 1781, both times beating Potoooooooo (pronounced "Pot eight oes"). Although Woodpecker was initially overshadowed by the success of Highflyer, it is Woodpecker who is responsible for the continuation of the Herod sire line to the present day. Woodpecker sired Buzzard, sire of Selim who in turn sired Sultan, six time leading sire, who in turn sired Bay Middleton, another leading sire in the mid 1800s.

Herod sired the winners of 497 races worth £201,505.

He was still covering mares until his death, at age 22, at Netherhall (written as Neather Hall in the old calendars) on 12 May 1780.

Pedigree

Sire line tree

Herod
Florizel
Brilliant
Moustrap
Crookshanks
Diomed
Centinel
Peacemaker
Stump-the-Dealer
Grey Diomed
Glaucus
Anthony
Sir Charles
Wrangler
Albemarle
Hamlintonian
Diomed (Darnaby)
Hamlintonian (Hancock)
Hamlintonian (Davis)
Top Gallant
Truxton
Wonder
Tennessee Oscar
Diomed (Lawrence)
Diomed (Ragland)
Diomed (Randolph)
Florizel (Ball)
Tuckahoe
Orphan
Florizel (Turpin)
Richmond
Enterprise
Vingt'un
Diomed (Kennedy)
Grey Diomed (Barksdale)
Eclipse
Monroe
Potomac
Little John
Sir Archy
Cicero
Sir Arthur
Director
Grey Archy
Spring Hill
Tecumseh
Young Sir Archy
Columbus
Warbler
Walk-In-The-Water
Timoleon
Carolinian
Contention
Kosciusko
Napoleon
Virginian
Sir Solomon
Rattler
Sir Charles
Sir William
Childers
Roanoke
Muckle John
Sumpter
Henry
John Richards
Stockholder
Arab
Bertrand
Cherokee
Marion
Phoenomenon
Sir Richard
Sir William of Transport
Robin Adair
Gohanna
Occupant
Pacific
Saxe Weimer
Crusader
Sir Archy Montorio
Giles Scroggins
Industry
Merlin
Red Gauntlet
Tarriff
Hyazim
Wild Bill
Copperbottom
Longwaist
Zinganee
Virginius
Muzzle Diomed
Duroc
Sir Lovell
Trouble
Marshal Duroc
American Eclipse
Cock of the Rock
Romp
American Star
Gracchus
Rob Roy
Fredericksburg
Madison
Doublehead
Constitution
Ulysses
Play or Pay
King William
Admiral
Fortunio
King Bladud
Fidget
Fidget Colt
Bustler
Prizefighter
Swordsman
Spartacus
Buffler
Lenox
Abundance
The Curragh Guide
Master Robert
Eager
Slapbang
Tartar
Ninety-three
Contractor
Evergreen
Holyhock
Apothecary
Bazaglo
Maximin
Alexis
Antipas
Magnet
Windlestone
Daredevil
Lucifer
Magnetic Needle
Telemachus
Boston
Plunder
Postmaster
Aurelius
Fitzherod
Mufti
Trafalgar
Rebel
Warwick
Woodpecker
Bullfinch
Farmer
Seagull
Buzzard
Poppinjay
Dotterel
Quiz
Tigris
Roller
Euphrates
Brainstorm
Glow-Worm
Bustard
Castrel
Bustard
Merlin
Pantaloon
Wind Hound
Thormanby
Glengarry
Kingman
Atlantic
Le Sancy
Le Samaritain
Roi Herode
Royal Canopy
Bonnie Nuit
New Twist
Good Twist
Gem Twist
Selim
Fandago
Champion
Azor
Sultan
Feramorz
Langar
Marcellus
Nicolo
Saracen
The Moslem
Turcoman
Deceiver
Pantaloon
Rubens
Raphael
Bobadil
Gainsborough
Sovereign
Strephon
Doctor Eady
Tandem
Taniers
Peter Lely
Titian
Holbein
Wiseacre
Roderick
Sir Edward Codrington
Hephestion
Junius
Buzzard (Blackburn)
Chanticleer
Traveller
Fitz Emily
Bob Booty
Dunkellin
Byron
Napoleon
Dragon
Spectator
Phoenix
Tom Tough
Dragon (Cage)
Hawk
Ostrich
Tom Tit
Young Woodpecker (Massey)
Young Woodpecker
Slender Billy
Gladish
Vivaldi
Bonaparte
Brother to Vivaldi
Bourdeaux
Grey Highlander
Clown
Blossom
Fulmine
Highflyer
Pharamond
Slope
Sour-Crout
Delpini
Timothy
Symmetry
Seymour
Moses
Rockingham
Noble
Sheet Anchor
Sir Peter Teazle
Agonistes
Barbarossa
Expectation
Knowlsey
Pipylin
Robin Redbreasted
Trafalgar
Young Peter Teazle
Ambrosio
Old England
Brown Bread
Stamford
Viscount
Sir Harry
Sir Alfred
Sir Hal
Moses
Archduke
Roseden
Sir Solomon
Haphazard
Don Cossack
X Y Z
Filho da Puta
Antar
Reginald
Figaro
Walton
Phantom
Vandyke Jr.
Rainbow
Partisan
Nectar
Waterloo
Arbutus
St. Patrick
Ditto
Luzborough
Sir Oliver
Doge of Venice
Olive
Caleb Quot'em
Sir Paul
Otho
Paulowitz
Fyldener
Buffalo
Bramshill
Tozer
Paris
Cardinal York
Advance
Petronius
Spadille
Dion
Quatorze
Vole
Manilla
Spindleshanks
Escape
Emigrant
Traveller
Skyscraper
Skyrocket
Walnut
Ashton
St. George
Pan
Oberon
Moorcock
Ptarmigan
Heathpoult
Plunder
Diamond
Justice
Douglas
Justice
Mentor
Rhadamanthus
Daedalus
Il-Mio
Scorpion
Adamant
Guildford
Hero
Phillador
Prince Ferdinand
True Blue
Boxer
Hammer
Weazle
Boxer
Fencer
Whipcord
Wickham
Fencer
Anvil
St. George
Cymbeline
Drone
Arra Kooker
Constitution
Young Drone
Lounger
Chance
Honeycomb
Emperor
Fortitude
John Bull
Admiral Nelson
Alfred
Fortitude
Georgiana
Muley Moloch
Cesario
Gauntlet
Paddy Bull
Ardrossan
Sir Malichi Malagrowther
Tom Tugg
Cornet
Commodore
Tom Pipes
Escape
Milesius
Rugantino
Nabocklish
Antagonist
Recordan
Souvenir
Guido
Pantaloon
Columbus
Argos
Gambler
Slender
Snake
Bagot
Master Bagot
Honest Ralph
Holyhock
Prince
Drone
Slug
Swindler
Marplot
Pygmalion
Loyal
Balance
Challenger
Phoenomenon
Ambidexter
Stride
Applegarth
Comet
Diomed (Tate)
Huby
Restless
Pilgrim
Standard
Wonder
Conqueror
Firetail
Stripling
Octavian
Antonio
Stotforth
Punch
Herod (Harpur)
Spectre
Posthumus
Monckton

References

External links
Thoroughbred Bloodlines: King Herod (GB)
Thoroughbred Heritage: Herod

1758 racehorse births
1780 racehorse deaths
Racehorses trained in the Kingdom of Great Britain
Racehorses bred in the Kingdom of Great Britain
British Champion Thoroughbred Sires
Thoroughbred family 26
Byerley Turk sire line